Hans Hermann Eschke (10 November 1856 in Berlin – 19 July 1904 in Singapore) was the first German Consul General in Singapore.

Early life
Eschke was the son of Professor Hermann Eschke (1823–1900), a prominent marine and landscape painter in Berlin, Germany. His father's close connections with officials at the court of the German Emperor are said to have been a crucial factor in Hans Hermann Eschke's advancement in the diplomatic service, which eventually led to him being posted to Singapore in 1889.

Eschke, who was a jurist, initially joined the Prussian Ministry of Justice. Later, he served as an attaché at the German embassy in London, after which he was sent to Singapore in 1889 as consul – the first career diplomat in the German Foreign Office to hold this post in Singapore. The German Empire was interested in widening its sphere of influence in the region, particularly in Tsingtao, China.

Arrival in Singapore
In Singapore, Eschke lost no time in joining a circle of well-respected and influential German merchants. Very soon after his arrival he had met Olga Sohst, daughter of the well-known German merchant and honorary consul Theodor Sohst. Olga and Hans married just three months after he set foot in Singapore. Olga's dowry enabled the young couple to buy their own house, "Mount Rosie". Thanks to the Sohst family's excellent connections, Eschke and his wife were able to establish themselves quickly as the standard-bearers of the local German community, in whose interests they worked assiduously and with much success.

Diplomatic career
Towards the end of 1898, Eschke was appointed the German Resident Minister in Bangkok, a temporary posting which lasted just over a year. During this period, his father-in-law Theodor, who had acted as the German honorary consul in Singapore before Eschke's arrival there, replaced him. In 1901, the German Consulate in Singapore was upgraded to a Consulate General and Eschke became the first Imperial German Consul General. That same year, his administrative jurisdiction was extended to the Johor Sultanate.

In January 1902, Eschke, still based in Singapore, was concurrently appointed consul for the British-controlled part of Borneo, Brunei, Sarawak, Labuan, and the Federated Malay States. He was also in charge of the Austro-Hungarian Consulate General. In December 1903, he took charge of the Turkish Consulate General as well. He had previously performed the same function at the local Russian diplomatic mission. For much of his time in Singapore, Eschke was the doyen of the consular corps. He held the rank of Hauptmann (Captain) in the Landwehr.

Demise

Eschke was held in high esteem in Singapore throughout his stay in the Straits, not only for representing German interests, but also as an "adopted" Singaporean by the locals, having lived there so long. These sentiments were echoed and emphasised in the local press following his unexpected death after a sudden and nasty bout of dysentery in July 1904. He was 47.

Both the Straits Times and the now-defunct Singapore Free Press and Mercantile Advertiser carried detailed obituaries. The Singapore Free Press wrote:
 

Eschke's grave was originally located at the Bukit Timah Cemetery, which was cleared in 1971 and turned into a park. Twelve grave monuments, including that of Eschke, were relocated to Fort Canning Green.

References

1856 births
1904 deaths
Germany–Singapore relations
Prussian diplomats